Restless Heart: The Confessions of Saint Augustine (distributed in the US as: Augustine: The Decline of the Roman Empire, Italian: Sant'Agostino) is a 2010 two-part television miniseries chronicling the life of St. Augustine, the early Christian theologian, writer and Bishop of Hippo Regius at the time of the Vandal invasion (AD 430).

This series was directed by Christian Duguay and was shot on location in Tunisia.

Plot
In 430 AD, in the besieged city of Hippo, the seventy year-old bishop Augustine tells Jovinus, a captain of the Roman guards, the story of how his Christian mother, Monica, saved him. Born in the North African city of Thagaste, Augustine studied in Carthage, becoming an accomplished but dissolute orator. After converting to Manichaeism, a guiltfree religion, he was called to the imperial court in Milan to serve as an opponent to the Christian bishop Ambrose. But when the Empress Justina sends imperial guards to clear out a basilica where Augustine's own mother is worshipping, he is won over to Christianity. Back in Hippo, Augustine urges the Roman garrison to negotiate with the Vandal King Genseric, but they proudly refuse. At that point, he too, passing up a chance to escape on a ship sent to rescue him by the Pope, stays by the side of his people.

Cast

 Alessandro Preziosi as  Augustine 
 Franco Nero as Augustine  in old age
 Monica Guerritore as Monica
 Johannes Brandrup as Valerius
 Alexander Held as  Valerius in old age
 Katy Louise Saunders as  Lucilla
 Sebastian Ströbel as  Fabius
 Serena Rossi as  Khalidà
 Götz Otto as Genseric, king of the Vandals
 Andrea Giordana as  Ambrose
 Cesare Bocci as Romaniano
 Francesca Cavallin as the Empress mother Iustina
 Dominic Atherton as the child Emperor Valentinian II
 Sonia Aquino as  Blesilla

See also
 List of historical drama films
 List of films set in ancient Rome

References

External links

 

Italian television miniseries
Television series set in the 5th century